Southern Environmental Law Center (SELC) is the largest 501(c)(3) environmental nonprofit organization in the Southern region, with more than 80 attorneys and 75 staff members working at the local, state, and federal level to protect the environment and health of the Southeast. Headquartered in Charlottesville, Virginia, SELC has nine offices in six states: Alabama, Georgia, North Carolina, South Carolina, Tennessee and Virginia. The organization also has an office on Capitol Hill.  

Founded in 1986 by President Emeritus Rick Middleton, SELC is currently under the leadership of Executive Director Jeff Gleason. It is supported by charitable gifts from individuals, families, and foundations.

Advocacy and litigation
In a unanimous decision, in April 2007 the  Supreme Court of the United States ruled power companies could no longer continue to extend the lives of old, coal-burning power plants without installing modern pollution controls. This ruling led to the largest power plant cleanup in U.S. history. SELC attorneys then blocked or deferred companies’ plans to construct seven new coal-burning units across six states, helping to retire one-third of the existing coal plant capacity in the region.

SELC’s years-long campaign to stop utilities from storing coal ash in unlined, leaking pits next to rivers has led to the largest ever cleanup of industrial pollution in the Southeast. The organization has reached agreements to store or recycle all coal ash in South Carolina. SELC’s work has prompted Duke Energy to clean up 8 of its 14 sites in North Carolina, with active cases at the rest. Its suit challenging TVA’s Gallatin plant resulted in the first time a federal court ordered a utility to excavate its coal ash.

After a six-year campaign spearheaded by SELC, Dominion Energy and Duke Energy abandoned the Atlantic Coast Pipeline. SELC successfully challenged six key pipeline permits, halted construction, and secured a precedential ruling in favor of environmental justice in Virginia.

The SELC is one of three environmental groups which filed suit against the United States Fish and Wildlife Service which "they say should have blocked the planned extension of the N.C. 540 highway across southern Wake County" because it would "threaten the existence of two endangered species of mussels that live in a creek the road would cross." The Law Center argued the case in the United States Court of Appeals for the Fourth Circuit where the court "vacated a key permit granted to the Atlantic Coast Pipeline," concluding "that the U.S. Fish and Wildlife Service provided no specific limits for the allowable impact on threatened and endangered species." 

An environmental justice lawsuit brought by SELC compelled a federal court to overturn a permit for a pipeline compressor station in Buckingham County, Virginia’s, historic community of Union Hill.

The organization’s Protect Our Coast campaign helped persuade the Obama Administration to remove the South Atlantic from seismic exploration and the federal offshore leasing plan in 2016.

SELC’s Solar Power Initiative is boosting solar growth in the South by removing disincentives and regulatory roadblocks.

When the Trump administration announced its effort to gut clean water protections from wetlands and streams that feed drinking water sources for 200 million Americans (and 32 million people in the South), SELC responded with a federal lawsuit that more than a dozen other groups signed on to.

Charity rating
SELC has a 99% score and the highest four-star rating from Charity Navigator, an independent charity assessment organization.

See also
 List of environmental and conservation organizations in the United States

References

External links
Southern Environmental Law Center home page

Organizations based in Charlottesville, Virginia 
Environmental organizations based in Virginia
1986 establishments in Virginia
Environmental organizations established in 1986
Legal advocacy organizations in the United States